Calder River or River Calder may refer to:

Australia
Calder River (Tasmania) in north-west Tasmania
Calder River (Victoria) 
Calder River (Western Australia) in the Kimberley region

United Kingdom

England
 River Calder, West Yorkshire, a major tributary of the River Aire
 River Calder, Cumbria, flows into the Irish Sea near Sellafield
 River Calder, Lancashire, a major tributary of the River Ribble
 River Calder, Wyre, Lancashire, a tributary of the River Wyre

Scotland
 River Calder, Highland, a tributary of the River Spey
 River Calder, Renfrewshire, near Lochwinnoch
 Tributaries of the River Clyde:
 Rotten Calder, near East Kilbride
 North Calder Water, from the Black Loch to Daldowie
 South Calder Water, near Wishaw
 Calder Water, near Strathaven, a tributary of the Avon Water